Berismyia is a genus of flies in the family Stratiomyidae.

Species
Berismyia fusca Giglio-Tos, 1893
Berismyia nigrofemorata Williston, 1900

References

Stratiomyidae
Brachycera genera
Taxa named by Ermanno Giglio-Tos
Diptera of South America